Nəbilər or Nabilar or Nebiler may refer to:

Nəbilər, Kalbajar, a village in the Kalbajar District of Azerbaijan
Nəbilər, Shusha, a village in the Shusha District of Azerbaijan

See also
 Nebiler (disambiguation)